Ondřej Hutník (born February 19, 1983) is a retired Czech Muay Thai kickboxer. He is a former SUPERKOMBAT Super Cruiserweight Championship title challenger.

Biography and career
On December 30, 2011, Hutník defeated Mohamed Boubkari and Frank Munoz, respectively, to win the Enfusion Kickboxing Tournament '11 at -95 kg in Prague, Czech Republic.

He defeated Pacome Assi by unanimous decision at Nitrianska Noc Bojovnikov in Nitra, Slovakia on October 27, 2012.

On November 9, 2013, he defeated Massinissa Hamaili in a SUPERKOMBAT Super Cruiserweight Title Eliminator bout.

He challenged Andrei Stoica for the vacant SUPERKOMBAT Super Cruiserweight Championship (-95 kg/209 lb) at the SUPERKOMBAT World Grand Prix 2013 Final in Galați, Romania on December 21, losing by unanimous decision.

On November 19, 2016 in  Marseille, France Ondrej Hutnik defeats Fabrice Aurieng by KO in round 4 with spinning backfist and becomes a new World Kickboxing Network super heavyweight world champion (oriental rules). The challenged title was previously owned by Jerome Le Banner who vacated the belt after retirement in 2015.

On July 27, 2017 Hutnik defeated Sergej Maslobojev of Lithuania via decision and won a vacant WKN European heavyweight title at Yangames Fight Night in Prague, Czech Republic.

Doping suspension 
On December 21, 2017, it was announced that Hutník failed a drug test in 2016 prior to La Nuit des Champions, testing positive for the banned substance hydroxystanozolol. He received a 4 years suspension by the National Anti-Doping Agency of France (AFLD) from the participation in all sports events organized or authorized by French sports federations until 5 January 2022. As a result, his KO win against Fabrice Aurieng was reverted to a no contest.

Titles
Professional:
W5 Professional Kickboxing
2017 W5 European Light Heavyweight Champion
World Kickboxing Network
2017 WKN European Oriental Rules Heavyweight Champion
World Independent Promoters Union
2013 W.I.P.U. "King of the Ring" K-1 Rules Heavyweight World Championship. (-95 kg)
World Full Contact Association
2012 W.F.C.A. European Heavyweight -95 kg Champion.
2007 W.F.C.A. Kickboxing Cruiserweight World Champion -86 kg, Lisbon
Enfusion
2011 Enfusion Kickboxing Tournament Champion
K-1
2006 Czech Muay Thai Champion
It's Showtime
2006 It's Showtime 75MAX Trophy Runner Up
2005 It's Showtime Prague Pool A Champion
Windy Cup
2005 Windy Cup Winner 

Amateur:
2010 I.F.M.A. World Champion  -91 kg
2006 I.F.M.A. European Cup Champion 
2004 I.F.M.A. World Vice Champion 
2002 I.F.M.A. European Cup Champion 
2001 W.K.A. World Champion 
2000 I.F.M.A. World Champion

Fight record 

|-
|-  bgcolor="#CCFFCC"
|2019-03-29 || Win || align="left" | Bruno Susano || XFN Legends || Prague, Czech Republic || Decision (Unanimous) || 3 || 
|-
|-  bgcolor="#CCFFCC"
|2018-05-04 || Win || align="left" | Petr Vondráček || Heroes Gate 20 || Prague, Czech Republic || Decision (Unanimous) || 3 || 
|-
! style=background:white colspan=9 |
|-
|-  bgcolor="#CCFFCC"
|2017-11-11 || Win || align="left" | Miran Fabjan ||  W5 Fortune Favors the Brave || Kosice, Slovakia || TKO || 4 || 
|-title.}}
|-
|-  bgcolor="#CCFFCC"
| 2017-07-27 || Win ||align=left| Sergej Maslobojev || Yangames Fight Night 2017 || Prague, Czech Republic || Decision (Majority) || 3||
|-
! style=background:white colspan=9 |
|-
|-  bgcolor="#FFBBBB"
| 2017-04-29 || Loss ||align=left| Rade Opačić || Simply the Best 14 Prague || Prague, Czech Republic || KO (High kick) || 1 || 
|-
|-  style="background:#c5d2ea;"
| 2016-11-19 || NC ||align=left| Fabrice Aurieng || Nuit des Champions 2016 || Marseille, France || No contest || 4 ||
|-
! style=background:white colspan=9 | 
|-
|-  bgcolor="#CCFFCC"
|2016-10-08 || Win ||align=left| Cătălin Moroșanu || W5 Grand Prix "Legends in Prague" || Prague, The Czech Republic || Decision (Unanimous) || 3 || 3:00
|-
|-  bgcolor="#CCFFCC"
| 2016-04-16 || Win ||align=left| Nicolas Wamba || Simply the Best 10 || Prague, Czech Republic || KO (Punch) || 3 || 
|-
! style=background:white colspan=9 |
|-
|-  bgcolor="#CCFFCC"
| 2016-03-18 || Win ||align=left| Toni Čatipović || Heroes Gate 15 || Prague, Czech Republic || Decision (Unanimous) || 3 || 3:00
|-
|-  bgcolor="#CCFFCC"
| 2015-12-05 || Win ||align=left| Janosch Nietlispach || Gibu Fight Night 2 || Prague, Czech Republic || Decision (Unanimous) || 3 || 3:00
|-
|-  bgcolor="#CCFFCC"
| 2015-10-23 || Win ||align=left| Toni Milanović || Heroes Gate 15 || Prague, Czech Republic || Decision || 3 || 3:00
|-
|-  bgcolor="#CCFFCC"
| 2015-09-26 || Win ||align=left| Jan Soukup || Mistrovství ČR v K1 WAKO pro || Prague, Czech Republic || Decision (Unanimous) || 3 || 3:00
|-
|-  bgcolor="#CCFFCC"
| 2015-04-10 || Win ||align=left| Igor Bugaenko || Heroes Gate 14 || Prague, Czech Republic || Decision (Unanimous) || 3 || 3:00
|-
|-  bgcolor="#CCFFCC"
| 2014-11-30 || Win ||align=left| Mikhail Tyuterev || W5 Crossroad of Times  || Bratislava, Slovakia || Decision ||3  || 3:00
|-
|-  bgcolor="#FFBBBB"
| 2014-06-12 || Loss ||align=left| Danyo Ilunga || Gibu Fight Night  || Praha, Czech Republic || TKO || 3 ||
|-
|-  bgcolor="#CCFFCC"
| 2014-04-26 || Win ||align=left| Eduardo Mendes || Gala Night Thaiboxing/ Enfusion Live 17|| Žilina, Slovakia || TKO (Ref. Stoppage) || 2 ||
|-
|-  bgcolor="#FFBBBB"
| 2013-12-21 || Loss ||align=left| Andrei Stoica || SUPERKOMBAT World Grand Prix 2013 Final || Galați, Romania || Decision (Unanimous) || 3 || 3:00
|-
! style=background:white colspan=9 |
|-
|-  bgcolor="#CCFFCC"
| 2013-11-09 ||Win ||align=left| Massinissa Hamaili || SUPERKOMBAT World Grand Prix 2013 Final Elimination || Ploiești, Romania ||TKO (Injury/Broken Rib) ||1 || 2:05
|-
! style=background:white colspan=9 |
|-
|-  bgcolor="#CCFFCC"
| 2013-06-14 || Win ||align=left| Stefan Leko || Time of Gladiator || Brno, Czech Republic || KO (Round Kick)  || 2 ||
|-
! style=background:white colspan=9 |
|-
|-  bgcolor="#CCFFCC"
| 2013-04-27 || Win ||align=left| Zinedine Hameur-Lain || Gala Night Thaiboxing || Žilina, Slovakia || KO (Round Kick) || 1 ||
|-  bgcolor="#CCFFCC"
| 2012-12-30 || Win ||align=left| Jorge Loren || Pěsti v Praze || Prague, Czech Republic || Decision (Unanimous) || 5 ||  3:00
|-
! style=background:white colspan=9 |
|-
|-  bgcolor="#CCFFCC"
| 2012-10-27 || Win ||align=left| Pacome Assi || Nitrianska Noc Bojovnikov || Nitra, Slovakia || Decision (Unanimous) || 3 || 3:00 
|-
|-  bgcolor="#CCFFCC"
| 2012-05-27 || Win ||align=left| Roland Dabinovci || Noc válečníků 4 || Kladno, Czech Republic || Decision (Unanimous) || 3 || 3:00 
|-
|-  bgcolor="#CCFFCC"
| 2012-04-14 || Win ||align=left| Martin Jahn || Souboj Titánů || Plzen, Czech Republic || TKO || 1 ||  
|-
|-  bgcolor="#CCFFCC"
| 2011-12-30 || Win ||align=left| Frank Muñoz || Enfusion Kickboxing Tournament '11, Final || Prague, Czech Republic || Decision (Unanimous) || 3 || 3:00 
|-
! style=background:white colspan=9 |
|-
|-  bgcolor="#CCFFCC"
| 2011-12-30 || Win ||align=left| Mohamed Boubkari || Enfusion Kickboxing Tournament '11, Semi Finals || Prague, Czech Republic || Decision (Unanimous) || 3 || 3:00 
|-
|-  bgcolor="#CCFFCC"
| 2011-11-19 || Win ||align=left| Shamil Abasov || Souboj Titánů || Plzen, Czech Republic ||  ||  ||  
|-
|-  bgcolor="#CCFFCC"
| 2011-05-27 || Win ||align=left| Redouan Cairo || Grand Prix Chomutov || Chomutov, Czech Republic || Decision (Unanimous) || 3 || 3:00 
|-
|-  bgcolor="#CCFFCC"
| 2011-03-12 || Win ||align=left| Michail Tjuterev || Gala night Thaiboxing || Zilina, Slovakia || Decision || 3 || 3:00
|-
|-  bgcolor="#CCFFCC"
| 2011-02-? || Win ||align=left| Thiago Martina || Enfusion Kickboxing Tournament '11, 2nd Round || Koh Samui, Thailand || KO (High Kick) || 3 || 
|-
! style=background:white colspan=9 |
|-
|-  bgcolor="#CCFFCC"
| 2011-01-? || Win ||align=left| Wendell Roche || Enfusion Kickboxing Tournament '11, 1st Round || Koh Samui, Thailand || Decision || 3 || 3:00 
|-
|-  bgcolor="#CCFFCC"
| 2010-06-24 || Win ||align=left| James Phillips || W.F.C.A. Prague || Prague, Czech Republic || Decision (Unanimous) || 3 || 3:00
|-
|-  bgcolor="#CCFFCC"
| 2010-03-20 || Win ||align=left| Arnold Oborotov || Gala Night Thaiboxing || Žilina, Slovakia|| Decision (Unanimous) || 3 || 
|-  bgcolor="#CCFFCC"
| 2010-02-13 || Win ||align=left| Hakan Aksoy || It's Showtime 2010 Prague || Prague, Czech Republic || Decision (Unanimous) || 3 || 3:00
|-
|-  bgcolor="#CCFFCC"
| 2009-11-20 || Win ||align=left| Jonathan Gromark || K-1 Rumble of the Kings 2009 in Stockholm || Stockholm, Sweden || Decision (Unanimous) || 3 || 3:00
|-
|-  bgcolor="#CCFFCC"
| 2009-08-29 || Win ||align=left| Rodney Glunder || It's Showtime 2009 Budapest || Budapest, Hungary || Decision || 3 || 3:00
|-
|-  bgcolor="#CCFFCC"
| 2008-11-08 || Win ||align=left| Clifton Brown || Janus Fight Night "The Legend" || Padova, Italy || TKO (Doc Stop/Cut) || 2 ||
|-
|-  bgcolor="#CCFFCC"
| 2008-09-06 || Win ||align=left| Tarik Charkaoui || It's Showtime 2008 Alkmaar || Alkmaar, Netherlands || TKO (Ref Stop/Liver Kick) || 3 ||
|-
|-  bgcolor="#FFBBBB"
| 2008-03-15 || Loss ||align=left| Tyrone Spong || It's Showtime 75MAX Trophy Final 2008, Title Fight || 's-Hertogenbosch, Netherlands || KO (Left Liver Punch) || 2 || 2:32
|-
! style=background:white colspan=9 |
|-
|-  bgcolor="#CCFFCC"
| 2007-11-30 || Win ||align=left| Leonildo Evora || Kickboxing Cup 2007 || Lisbon, Portugal || KO ||  ||
|-
! style=background:white colspan=9 |
|-
|-  bgcolor="#FFBBBB"
| 2007-06-02 || Loss ||align=left| Najim Ettouhlali || Gentleman Fight Night IV || Tilburg, Netherlands || Decision || 5 || 3:00
|-
|-  bgcolor="#CCFFCC"
| 2007-04-07 || Win ||align=left| Yücel Fidan || Balans Fight Night || Tilburg, Netherlands || Decision || 5 || 3:00
|-
|-  bgcolor="#CCFFCC"
| 2007-03-24 || Win ||align=left| Karapet Papijan || Fights at the Border presents: It's Showtime Trophy 2007 || Lommel, Belgium || Decision || 3 || 3:00
|-
! style=background:white colspan=9 |
|-
|-  bgcolor="#CCFFCC"
| 2006-12-16 || Win ||align=left| Jiri Zak || K-1 Fighting Network Prague Round '07, Title Fight || Prague, Czech Republic || Decision || 5 || 3:00
|-
! style=background:white colspan=9 |
|-
|-  bgcolor="#FFBBBB"
| 2006-09-23 || Loss ||align=left| Şahin Yakut || It's Showtime 75MAX Trophy Final 2006, Final || Rotterdam, Netherlands || Decision || 3 || 3:00
|-
! style=background:white colspan=9 |
|-
|-  bgcolor="#CCFFCC"
| 2006-09-23 || Win ||align=left| Joerie Mes || It's Showtime 75MAX Trophy Final 2006, Semi Finals || Rotterdam, Netherlands || Decision || 3 || 3:00
|-
|-  bgcolor="#CCFFCC"
| 2006-09-23 || Win ||align=left| Dmitry Shakuta || It's Showtime 75MAX Trophy Final 2006, Quarter Finals || Rotterdam, Netherlands || Decision || 3 || 3:00
|-
|-  bgcolor="#CCFFCC"
| 2005-12-18 || Win ||align=left| Sem Braan || It's Showtime 75MAX Trophy Prague, Pool A Final || Prague, Czech Republic || Decision || 3 || 3:00
|-
! style=background:white colspan=9 |
|-
|-  bgcolor="#CCFFCC"
| 2005-12-18 || Win ||align=left| Michal Hansgut || It's Showtime 75MAX Trophy Prague, Pool A Semi Finals || Prague, Czech Republic || Decision || 3 || 3:00
|-
|-  bgcolor="#CCFFCC"
| 2005-10-30 || Win ||align=left| Omar Benmahdi || It's Showtime 75MAX Trophy Alkmaar || Alkmaar, Netherlands || Decision (Unanimous) || 3 || 3:00
|-
|-  bgcolor="#CCFFCC"
| 2005-06-12 || Win ||align=left| Sem Braan || It's Showtime 2005 Amsterdam || Amsterdam, Netherlands || Decision || 5 || 3:00
|-
|-  bgcolor="#CCFFCC"
| 2004-03-14 || Win ||align=left| Mehdi Rajaa || Killer Dome V, Bijlmer Sportcentrum || Amsterdam, Netherlands || KO ||  ||
|-  bgcolor="#CCFFCC"
| 2003-09-28 || Win ||align=left| Alviar Lima || Muay Thai Champions League IX || Rotterdam, Netherlands || Decision (Unanimous) || 5 || 3:00
|-
|-  bgcolor="#CCFFCC"
| 2003-02-16 || Win ||align=left| Rasit Biner || Gala in Schuttersveld || Rotterdam, Netherlands || KO (Knee to the liver) || 1 || 
|-  bgcolor="#FFBBBB"
| 2002-12-14 || Loss ||align=left| José Reis || K-1 Spain MAX 2002, Semi Finals || Barcelona, Spain || TKO (Doc Stop/Cut) || 1 ||
|-
|-  bgcolor="#CCFFCC"
| 2002-12-14 || Win ||align=left| Carlos Heredia || K-1 Spain MAX 2002, Quarter Finals || Barcelona, Spain || Decision || 3 || 3:00
|-
|-  bgcolor="#c5d2ea"
| 2001-06-03 || Draw ||align=left| Kieran Keddle || Amazing Muaythai Fight Night II || Watford, England, UK || Decision Draw || 5 || 3:00
|-
|-
| colspan=9 | Legend:    

|-  style="background:#cfc;"
| 2010-12- || Win||align=left| Dzianis Hancharonak || 2010 I.F.M.A. World Muaythai Championships, Finals || Bangkok, Thailand || Decision || 4 || 2:00
|-
! style=background:white colspan=9 |
|-  style="background:#cfc;"
| 2010-12- || Win||align=left| Tsotne Rogava || 2010 I.F.M.A. World Muaythai Championships, Semi Finals || Bangkok, Thailand || Decision || 4 || 2:00
|-
| colspan=9 | Legend:

See also 
List of It's Showtime events 
List of male kickboxers

References

1983 births
Living people
People from Prague-East District
Czech male kickboxers
Cruiserweight kickboxers
Heavyweight kickboxers
Czech Muay Thai practitioners
SUPERKOMBAT kickboxers
Doping cases in kickboxing
Sportspeople from the Central Bohemian Region